Scrag can refer to:

 Global Rocket 1, given the NATO reporting name SS-X-10 Scrag
 A monster, also referred to as a "wizard", in the 1996 computer game Quake
 A type of aquatic troll in Dungeons & Dragons
 A derogatory term for a girl or woman, especially in Australia
 Scrag end, a cut of lamb taken from the neck
 To play fight or rough and tumble between adult and child
 To kill by hanging or strangling, nearly synonymous with 'lynch'

Australian English